The 1899 SAFA season was the 23rd edition of the top level of Australian Rules football to be played in South Australia. South Adelaide went on to record its 8th premiership.

Electorate football 
The 1899 season saw the introduction of compulsory electorate football in Adelaide, forcing players to play for the club in the district in which they resided.

In the last decade, football in Adelaide had been suffering from reduced public interest, and the three weaker teams (West Adelaide, North Adelaide and West Torrens) always operated at a financial loss, exacerbated by their poor records on field.

It was thought that by introducing electorate football, the talent would be spread more evenly across the six teams, making for more entertaining matches and higher attendances across all teams. The proposed changes were fought by South Adelaide and Port Adelaide, who threatened to leave the SAFA and form their own league if they were brought in. As a compromise, the scheme was brought in on a one-year trial basis, before ultimately being accepted permanently.

Minor rounds 
The minor rounds comprised twelve matches.  finished as the minor premiers, one point ahead of Norwood.

Major rounds 
The major premiership was contested under the same system which had been adopted by the Victorian Football League in 1898 (except adapted for six teams instead of eight). The six teams were broken into two sections: section A comprised South Adelaide (1st), Port Adelaide (3rd) and West Adelaide (5th); section B comprised Norwood (2nd), West Adelaide (4th) and North Adelaide (6th). Each section played an individual round-robin; then, the section winners played off in a final. The minor premiers, South Adelaide, would then have the right to challenge the winner of the final to a Grand Final for the major premiership.

Sectional matches

Finals

References 

SAFA
South Australian National Football League seasons